Chandradwip or Chandradvipa is a small region in Barisal District, Bangladesh. It was once the ancient and medieval name of Barishal.

History 
The history of Chandradwip goes back to the Pre-Pala Period.

Chandradwip was successively ruled by the Mauryas, Guptas and the Palas. Towards the end of the 10th century A.D., the Chandra Dynasty gave this region a "distinct political identity."

The Chandras were succeeded by the Deva Dynasty. After a brief period of confusion, the Deva Dynasty occupied this region and established their capital at Kachua. They were followed by the Basu and Mitra Mazumdar families. During the latter's rule, Chandradwip was auctioned off.

Until the 18th century A.D., the Hindu rulers of Chandradwip were independent. After that this kingdom became a Zamindari, while the greater part of Chandradwip was named Bakerganj after a Muslim adventurer, Bakar Khan. Raja Ramchandra Basu's successor, Kirtinarayan Basu, notably converted to Sunni Islam and founded the Baklai dynasty of Keora.

The prosperity of this kingdom reached its zenith during the time of Kandarpanarayan Rai. Many Chinese and European travelers left interesting accounts about this kingdom. The earliest Chinese accounts describe this region as " a famous place for the worship of the Hindu-Bauddha-Tantrik deity Tara" The Temple of Tara was situated near the seashore. It was visible from the sea. Chandragomin, the famous grammarian of the 6th century, wrote his hymns on Tara from this place. In a manuscript of 1015 A.D., the region of Chandradwip was mentioned with the Tara-Temple. It was there during the rule of the Chandra kings.

During the Mughal Period, this region came to be known as Bakla-Chandradwip.

Rabindranath Tagore wrote Bou Thakuranir Haath, a famous book about the Basu Maharani of Chandradwip which was later filmed as Bou Thakuranir Haat.

The ancient Chandra Dip was situated at the bank of the Sugandha river. The eastern side of the present Nalchity town at Village Maloar, Ward No-4, Union No -8, PO- Shiddokathi, ( Here exist Chandra Kanda schools and still have fallen ancients Chandra families home) was the center of the ancient Chandra Dip and North side of the Sugandha river at Tillarpar, Rayapur was the center of Backla. Backla was the newest name. Here the first Church was established and it was broken-down into river, here lived many foreign people. Note: The ancient Sugandha river's name will be found in the ancient Kalika Purana, Mahabharat and it will be found in many old and ancient books that the Chandra king families's were lived between the present Barishal and Bakergonj. And the Chandra Dip was the capital of the ancient Bangla. Caution: Present Barishal is a new city and it was not the center of the ancient Chandra Dip. In the last British period, Princess Joy Gun BB family's all males - Up Jal Mazi, prince of London ( who came with British royal family sword and buckler to win subcontinent India and his brother took back, sword and buckler were boat and his boat was sunk) and his sons and other companions was killed feeding poison. Joy Gun BB arranged a great feeding in her alive time, and she invited the guests with drum sounds. Then, in the last British period in the subcontinent, India dividation time was killed Prince Manu Thakur ( Last prince of Chandra king family), firstly Manu Thakur family took shelter/kept hid themselve in Joy Gun BB's home one month, then Manu Thakur family went runaway from their motherland in deep night. The center of the Chandra Dip was burning. Still, the fallen homes names are exist as before in Hindu family names.

See also 
Hayat Mahmud, military commander for the Raja of Chandradwip

References 

Ancient divisions in Bengal
Barishal District
Geography of Barisal Division